Bugados a.k.a. Game Crashers is a Brazilian sitcom created and developed by Scriptonita Films that airs on the Gloob. Developed for a young public, the sitcom is a huge audience hit and has aired two seasons of 26 episodes. The show's third season will premiere in 2021, and the scripts for the show's fourth season are already in development.

Premise 
Neo, Glinda and Tyron are video game characters. Mig and Carol are brothers with diametrically opposed personalities. Everything is going smoothly until an extraordinary event happens and changes everyone's lives. Bugados is a children's series that tells the story of a group formed when three video game characters – a robot, a cosmic skater and an intergalactic defender – decide to jump off the screen and into real life. With the help of Mig and Carol, they become school students and try to have normal lives. Gradually, they find out about their skills and complementary talents, and end up getting everything they want. And what they don't want. With a lot of energy and little experience, they get involved in all kinds of trouble. Tired of fighting villains and saving the universe hundreds of times a day, they now have real friends and are looking for something bigger and more fascinating: living the great adventure that is real life.

Format 
Bugados is a sitcom with 26 episodes per season, with the broadcast rights for the first two seasons acquired by Gloob (cable channel owned by Globosat). Bugados uses the dynamic and elements of the comedy of errors to produce humor and, at the same time, make the audience empathize with the protagonists. The series is entirely shot in a studio. Its basic scenarios include the premises of a school and a hyper-technological space that mixes game with reality, called INTERMUNDOS, where the group meets to relax, plan their actions and, of course, play video games.

Cast

References 

Brazilian children's television series
Children's comedy television series